Kizuki may refer to:
Aoi Kizuki (born 1989), Japanese retired professional wrestler
Minami Kizuki (born 1989), Japanese singer
"Kizuki", an episode of the Japanese anime television series xxxHolic
Kizuki, a character in Haruki Murakami's novel Norwegian Wood
Kizuki as in the Twelve Kizuki, or Twelve Demon Moons, a [[List of Demon Slayer: Kimetsu no Yaiba characters#Twelve Demon Moons|group of elite demon henchmen in the anime and manga Demon Slayer: Kimetsu no Yaiba]]

See also
Kitsuki, Ōita, Japan
Kisuki, Central Province, Kenya
Kisuki, Shimane, former town in Japan

Japanese-language surnames